

Martin Grase (3 May 1891 – 3 August 1963) was a German general during World War II.  He was a recipient of the  Knight's Cross of the Iron Cross with Oak Leaves of Nazi Germany.

Awards and decorations
 Iron Cross (1914)  2nd Class (28 September 1914) &  1st Class (6 December 1916)
 Clasp to the Iron Cross (1939) 2nd Class (24 September 1939) & 1st Class (5 July 1940)
 Knight's Cross of the Iron Cross with Oak Leaves
 Knight's Cross on 18 October 1941 as Oberst and commander of Infanterie-Regiment 1
 Oak Leaves on 23 May 1943 as Generalleutnant and commander of 1. Infanterie Division

References

Citations

Bibliography

 
 

1891 births
1963 deaths
People from Człuchów
People from West Prussia
Generals of Infantry (Wehrmacht)
German Army personnel of World War I
Prussian Army personnel
Recipients of the clasp to the Iron Cross, 1st class
Recipients of the Knight's Cross of the Iron Cross with Oak Leaves
German prisoners of war in World War II
Reichswehr personnel
20th-century Freikorps personnel